Travia is an Italian surname. Notable people with the surname include:

Alfredo Travia (1924–2000), Italian footballer
Anthony J. Travia (1911–1993), American lawyer, politician, and judge

Italian-language surnames